Mario Gamper (born 3 August 1999) is an Austrian racing cyclist, who currently rides for UCI Continental team . His brothers Florian Gamper and Patrick Gamper are also professional cyclists.

References

External links

1999 births
Living people
Austrian male cyclists
Place of birth missing (living people)
European Games competitors for Austria
Cyclists at the 2019 European Games
21st-century Austrian people